St. Agnes College is an autonomous Catholic institution located in Mangalore, India. The college offers undergraduates and postgraduate programmes in arts and sciences, affiliated with Mangalore University.

History
The Apostolic Carmel Congregation was founded by Venerable Mother Veronica in 1868 and established at Mangalore, India, in 1870. The college was founded by Mother Mary Aloysia and formally inaugurated on 2 July 1921 under the Madras University.

Accreditation
The college was awarded the status of 'College with Potential for Excellence' by the UGC in 2017. The college has been assessed and re-accredited with an 'A+' Grade and CGPA 3.65 out of 4.

Departments
Business Administration
Botany
Chemistry
Commerce
Computer Applications
Computer Science
Economics
English
Hindi
History
Kannada
Mathematics
Microbiology
Physics
Political Science
Psychology
Secretarial Practice
Statistics
Zoology
French
Malayalam
Physical Education
M.A. English
M.Com.
M.Sc. Psychology
M.Sc. Chemistry
M.Sc. Big Data Analytics
M.Sc. Clinical Psychology

Achievements 
 The college is the recipient of the "Jimmy and Roselyn Carter Foundation" partnership international award for its path breaking work in the field of water shed management.
 The college was awarded the status of 'College with Potential for Excellence' by the UGC in 2006. 
 The college has been recognized as a college of excellence by the UGC New Delhi in 2017.
 The college is the recipient of Star College Status by DBT, MST, Govt.of India.

References

External links
Official website

Universities and colleges in Mangalore
Colleges of Mangalore University
Academic institutions formerly affiliated with the University of Madras